Jebudo is an island in South Korea, located in Jebu-ri, Seosin-myeon, Hwaseong-si, Gyeonggi-do. It is connected to Songgyo-ri, Seosin-myeon, Hwaseong-si, Keonggi-do by a two-lane road, but it is impassable twice a day for three to four hours, due to the high tide.

The "Jebudo Beach" which is located in southern Jebudo is renowned as a summer vacation destination. It is also popular among tourists as it is close to Seoul and Incheon.

Geography
Jebudo roughly forms an inverted triangle and the edge of the southwest coast stretches away into the sea like the tail of swallow. The relatively flat coastline contains many large mud flats. While the mainland is dominated by agricultural activities, the coastline has been mainly developed for tourism. 

There island sports two mountains: "Mt. Dangsan", located 62.4 meters above sea level, is in the middle of the island, and Mt. Tapjae located 66.7 meters above sea level, in the northwestern part of the island.

The origin of names
The islanders originally earned a living through fishing and agriculture. Currently, most locals work in the lodging business or service industry. The main commercial street is near Jebudo Beach. 

Jebudo was called "Jeobisum" or "Jebbisum" which means "the island overlooking from land." "Jeburi" derived from the word "Jeyakbukyoung" in the thousand-character text in the middle of the Chosun dynasty. "Jeyakbukyoung" means "a man helps a young child and an old man walk over the mud flat."

Footnotes

 The sea route transit time : Homepage of Hwaseong Jebumauel (2015. 6. 22)
 The origin of name of a village : Homepage of Seosin-myeon center (2015. 6. 2)

Hwaseong, Gyeonggi
Islands of Gyeonggi Province
Ansan
Islands of the Yellow Sea